Karnat or Karnata dynasty was a dynasty established in 1097 CE by Nanyadeva. The dynasty had two capitals which were Simraungadh in Bara District of Nepal and Darbhanga, Bihar which became the second capital during the reign of Gangadeva. The kingdom controlled the areas we today know as Tirhut or Mithila in Bihar state of India and Nepal. This region is bounded by the Mahananda River in the east, the Ganges in the south, the Gandaki River in the west and by the Himalayas in the North. Under the Karnats, Mithila enjoyed almost full sovereignty from 1097 until 1324.

According to French orientalist and indologist Sylvain Lévi, Nanyadeva established his supremacy over Simraungadh probably with the help of Chalukya king Vikramaditya VI. After the reign of Vikramaditya VI in 1076 CE, he led the successful military campaign against the Pala dynasty and the Sena dynasty. During the reign of Harisimhadeva, the Karnats also carried out raids into Nepal with the Karnat army under the leadership of the general and minister, Caṇḍeśvara Ṭhakkura.

History

Origins
The origins of the Karnats of Mithila (Karnas) lie with South India, Sena dynasty inscriptions refer to Nanyadeva as Karnata-Kulabhusana indicating that he had his origins in the South (Vatapi, Karnataka) and likely arrived in the North as part of the Chalukya invasions. His ancestors were petty chieftains and adventurers in Eastern India and Nanyadeva carved out his own kingdom in Mithila. 

When Nanyadeva first arrived in the region in 1093 A.D., he originally established his stronghold in Nanapura in Champaran of Bihar and referred to himself as Mahashamantadhipati as confirmed by the local traditions of Mithila. The title suggests that he was likely originally a commander in the Chalukaya army. He later shifted his capital to Simraungadh.

Downfall
Harisimhadeva (r. 1295 to 1324 CE), the sixth descendant of Nanyadeva was ruling the Tirhut Kingdom. At the same time the Tughlaq dynasty came to power, which ruled the Delhi sultanate and most of Northern India from 1320 to 1413 CE. In 1324 CE, the founder of the Tughlaq dynasty and Sultan of Delhi, Ghiyasuddin Tughlaq turned his attention towards Bengal. The Tughlaq army invaded Bengal and on his way back to Delhi, The sultan heard about the Simraungarh which was flourishing inside the jungle. The last king of the Karnata dynasty Harisimhadeva didn't show his strength and left the fort as he heard the news of approaching army of the Tughlaq Sultan towards the Simraungarh. The Sultan and his troop stayed there for 3 days and cleared the dense forest. Finally on day 3, the army attacked and entered into the huge fort whose walls was tall and surrounded by 7 big ditches.

The remains are still scattered all over the Simroungarh region. The king Harisingh Deva fled northwards into the then Nepal. The son of Harisimhadeva, Jagatsinghaeva married the widow princess of Bhaktapur Nayak Devi.

Legacy
Under the Karnatas, Mithila experienced a period of relative peace which allowed for authors, poets and artists to receive royal patronage. The Maithili language grew strongly during this period as new literature and folk songs were created. The philosopher, Gangeśa Upādhyāya, introduced the Navya-Nyāya school of thought which remained active in India until the 18th century.
The general religious attitude of the people was conservative and the priestly aristocracy of Maithil Brahmins dominated the royal court.
The Varna Ratnakara of Jyotirishwar Thakur was also composed during the reign of Harisimhadeva.

Rulers
There is debate as to who succeeded Nanyadeva as ruler of the Karnat dynasty of Mithila as he had two sons, Gangadeva and Malladeva. Most scholars agree that Gangadeva was the ruler however it is accepted that Malladeva formed his own stronghold in the village of Bheet-Bhagwanpur. The rulers of Karnat dynasty are as follows:

Later Karnats
After Harisimhadeva fled Mithila, evidence exists of Karnat Kings still ruling some parts of the region up to the 15th century during the same time that the Oiniwar dynasty controlled central parts of Mithila. In Champaran, the ruler was Prithvisimhadeva and his successors including Madansimhadeva. Their territory extended up to Gorakhpur district. Prithvisimhadeva was considered to be a descendant of Harisimhadeva.
Other remnants of the Karnat dynasty were also found in parts of Saharsa and Madhepura districts where inscriptions have been found that refer to a ruler called Sarvasimhadeva.

Descendants
It is said that after his defeat, Harisimhadeva fled to Kathmandu where his descendants became the founders of the Malla dynasty of Kathmandu. The Mallas were noted as great patrons of the Maithili language.

It is also said that another branch of the Karnats remained in Mithila and their descendants became the Gandhavariya Rajputs of North Bihar who held many chiefdoms in the region.

Architecture

Inscriptions and artefacts related to Karnat dynasty have been found throughout the Mithila region including in both Simraungadh and Darbhanga. From Simraungadh, steles have been recovered that resemble Pala-Sena art. This was likely due to the close contact the Kingdoms had with each other due to being neighbours with allowed for cultural exchange. Many of these steles depict various Hindu goddesses and are typical of the Bihar production of the second half of the 12th century, especially in relation to the ornaments.

See also
 Simraungadh

References

Dynasties of India
Kingdoms of Bihar
History of Bihar
History of Nepal
Dynasties of Nepal
11th-century establishments in Nepal
14th-century disestablishments in Nepal